Kourtiagou Reserve is a partial reserve in Burkina Faso. 
Established in 1957 it is located in Tapoa Province and covers an area of 510 km. Its name stems from the river Kourtiagou which is the western border of the reserve. In the East it is divided from the W National Park by the road R7 from Tansarga to Banikoara. The southern border is the national border to Benin.

References

Protected areas of Burkina Faso
Tapoa Province
Protected areas established in 1957
1957 establishments in French Upper Volta